The Agaw or Agew ( Agäw, modern Agew) are a pan-ethnic identity native to the northern highlands of Ethiopia and neighboring Eritrea. They speak the Agaw languages, which belong to the Cushitic branch of the Afroasiatic language family, and are therefore linguistically closest related to peoples speaking other Cushitic languages. 

The Agaw peoples in general were historically noted by travelers and outside observers to have practiced what some described as a “Hebraic religion”, though some practiced Ethiopian Orthodoxy, and many were Beta Israel Jews. A small minority have adopted Islam in the last few centuries. Thousands of Agaw Beta Israel converted to Christianity in the 19th and early 20th century (both voluntarily and forcibly), becoming the Falash Mura, though many are now returning to Judaism.

History

The Agaw are perhaps first mentioned in the third-century Monumentum Adulitanum, an Aksumite inscription recorded by Cosmas Indicopleustes in the sixth century. The inscription refers to a people called "Athagaus" (or Athagaous), perhaps from ʿAd Agaw, meaning "sons of Agaw." The Athagaous first turn up as one of the peoples conquered by the unknown king who inscribed the Monumentum Adulitanum. The Agaw are later mentioned in an inscription of the fourth century emperor Ezana of Axum and the sixth-century emperor Kaleb of Axum. Based on this evidence, a number of experts embrace a theory first stated by Edward Ullendorff and Carlo Conti Rossini that they are the original inhabitants of much of the northern Ethiopian Highlands, and were either forced out of their original settlements or assimilated by Semitic-speaking Tigrayans, Amharas and Tigrinyas. Cosmas Indicopleustes also noted in his Christian Topography that a major gold trade route passed through the region "Agau". The area referred to seems to be an area east of the Tekezé River and just south of the Semien Mountains, perhaps around Lake Tana.

They currently exist in a number of scattered enclaves, which include the Bilen in and around Keren, Eritrea; the Qemant people (including the now-relocated Beta Israel), who live around Gondar in the North Gondar Zone of the Amhara Region, west of the Tekezé River and north of Lake Tana; a number of Agaw live south of Lake Tana, around Dangila in the Agew Awi Zone of the Amhara Region; and another group live in and around Soqota in the former province of Wollo, now part of the Amhara Region, along with Lasta, Tembien, and Abergele.

The Cushitic speaking Agaw ruled during the Zagwe dynasty of Ethiopia from about 900 to 1270. The name of the dynasty itself comes from the Ge'ez phrase Ze-Agaw (meaning "of the Agaw"), and refers to the Agaw people.

Language

The Agaw speak Agaw languages. They are a part of the Cushitic branch of the Afro-Asiatic family. Many also speak other languages such as Amharic, Tigrinya and/or Tigre.

Subgroups
 The Northern Agaw are known as Bilen, capital Keren
 The Western Agaw are known as Qemant
 The Eastern Agaw are known as Xamir
 The Southern Agaw are known as Awi

Notable people
 Gebre Mesqel Lalibela, ruler of Ethiopia who is credited with having constructed the rock-hewn churches of Lalibela
  Na'akueto La'ab, Kedus Harbe and Yetbarak, other Zagwe kings
 Abebaw Tadesse, Ethiopian general

See also
 Zagwe dynasty
 Bilen people

References

Ethnic groups in Ethiopia
Cushitic-speaking peoples